Nephopterix concineratella is a species of snout moth in the genus Nephopterix. It was described by Émile Louis Ragonot in 1887. It is found in Central Asia (it was described in Tarbagatai).

References

Moths described in 1887
Phycitini